Jackson County is a county in the U.S. state of West Virginia. As of the 2020 census, the population was 27,791. Its county seat is Ripley, and its largest municipality is Ravenswood.

History
In 1674, frontiersman Gabriel Arthur visited a large Native American village, probably the first white person to reach the area. French traders visited by 1796 and British traders by 1703. In 1749, Celeron De Blainville and his party traveling on the Ohio River left lead plates claiming the area for France. Baltimore-born explorer Christopher Gist visited the following year.

In 1770, George Washington with his friend Dr. James Craik and Col. William Crawford surveyed what eventually became Jackson County, staying on their return from Fort Pitt along Sand Creek at an Iroquois village led by Keoshuta and later at his hunting camp (which later became Ravenswood). Washington patented land claims in that area in 1793. and other land was deeded to Albert Gallatin. The future Ravenswood site was acquired by Sallie Ashton, wife of Alexandria, Virginia judge Nicholas Fitzhugh, and purchased from other heirs by Henry FItzhugh, who moved to and developed the area, including building a saw and gristmill. The first (private) school in the county was opened in Cottageville in 1807, the second school at Murrayville in 1818, followed by a school at Ripley in 1829 and one at Ravenswood in 1839. Hunter and Indian fighter Jesse Hughes (1750-1829) settled in Jackson County, but he and his wife were evicted in their old age for failing to properly secure the title for the farm on which they had lived for decades.

Incorporation and splits
Two years later (in 1831) citizens petitioned for incorporating the county, which was formed from sections of Kanawha, Wood, and Mason Counties, and named for Andrew Jackson, seventh President of the United States.

Ripley, on Big Mill Creek about 12 miles from its confluence with the Ohio River and the location of a bridge on the West Columbia Pike as well as both a sawmill and a flour and grist mill (which also had a carding machine to make wool yarn), was laid out in 1832 and became the county seat; the courthouse was completed by October 1833, although it was not incorporated until 1852 (and re-incorporated in 1867). Ravenswood, about 12 miles further up Big Mill Creek, would be platted the next year by Henry Fitzhugh. Bartholomew Fleming began operating a ferry at Ravenswood in 1840, and a wagon road between Ravenswood and Spencer (which later became Roane County's seat) was completed in the early 1840s. However, the Baltimore and Ohio Railroad would not reach Ravenswood and Spencer (on the Wheeling to Huntington line) until 1886. Jackson County's population in 1840 was 4,890.

Increased settlement led to the formation of two additional counties from parts of what had been Jackson County. In 1848, the Virginia General Assembly authorized the creation of Wirt County from inland portions of Jackson and Wood Counties. In 1856, the Virginia General Assembly created Roane County from Jackson County.

American Civil War
During the American Civil War, the county was divided, but tilted toward the Union, and suffered from raids and bushwackers. At the Virginia Secession Convention of 1861, its joint delegate with upstream Roane County, lawyer Franklin P. Turner, twice voted for secession after rival meetings held by pro- and anti-secession forces in Jackson County on April 8, 1861. Jackson County sent several delegates to the Wheeling Convention, but Roane County sent none. Daniel E. Frost of Ravenswood, editor of the county's first newspaper and who had represented both counties in the Virginia House of Delegates, became the delegate for both counties. Fellow delegates also elected him the Speaker of the Restored Government's General Assembly held at Wheeling in 1861 and 1862 (which prepared for West Virginia statehood). Col. Frost would die fighting for the Union in 1863. Henrietta Fitzhugh Barre, the daughter of Henry Fitzhugh, sympathized with the Confederacy and kept a diary, first published in 1961. Another former delegate George B. Crow of Angerona (a silver boom town) would enlist as a Confederate and also reach the rank of colonel, but he survived the war. Confederate raiders attacked Ravenswood and Ripley in May and September, 1862, and again in May, 1863.

In July 1863, the Battle of Buffington Island near Ravenswood became the only naval action in West Virginia. The 9th West Virginia supported the tinclad and ironclad naval vessels, and they and Union forces across the Ohio River captured 1700 Confederates and set the stage for the capture of CSA Major General John Hunt Morgan and ended his raids.

When West Virginia became a state in 1863, its counties were divided into civil townships, with the intention of encouraging local government.  This proved impractical in the heavily rural state, and in 1872 the townships were converted into magisterial districts.  Jackson county was divided into five townships: Gilmore, Grant, Hushan's Mills, Mill Creek, and Washington. All white males who owned at least a house and 12 square feet of land were granted the right to vote.  Hushan's Mills, including the area around Cottageville, was subsequently renamed "Union".  In 1871, Gilmore Township was renamed "Ravenswood", and Mill Creek became "Ripley", after the county's two chief towns.  All five townships became magisterial districts in 1872.  They remained stable for over a hundred years, until in the 1990s they were consolidated into three new districts: Eastern, Northern, and Western.

Postwar development
Many former Virginians from the Clinch River Valley in southwest Virginia settled in the area by 1877, so the Bruen Lands Feud (also known as the Roane County Land Wars, which began with the death of a War of 1812 veteran circa 1845, leaving heirs in New York State, and was the subject of the 1864 U.S. Supreme Court decision in Harvey v. Tyler) reached Jackson county and led to several murders. The brother of a murdered U.S. Deputy Marshall published an account.

Timbering and oil and gas operations caused Jackson County's population to rise to 19,000 in 1900; it had the 6th largest area of cultivatable land of all West Virginia counties (divided mainly into small farms, hence by 1997 it also had the second largest number of farms in the Mountain state).
Kaiser Aluminum built a smelting and manufacturing complex beginning in 1954 that became a major employer in Jackson county. It changed hands several times after 1988 and experienced a major strike in the 1990s. The aluminum plant closed in 2015, although the rolling mill (under separate ownership since 2003 and which also changed ownership several times) still operates.

The Cedar Lakes Conference Center was also established circa 1954 and still operates (now through the U.S. Department of Agriculture), as does a Baptist conference center serving approximately 700 churches. The Jackson County Maritime and Industrial Complex encompasses 159 acres, including 25 acres devoted to barge loading and unloading.

Geography
The Ohio River forms part of Jackson County's western border. Sandy Creek and Mill Creek, tributaries of the Ohio, flow through the county's northern and central portions.

Major highways

  Interstate 77
  U.S. Highway 33
  West Virginia Route 2
  West Virginia Route 34
  West Virginia Route 62
  West Virginia Route 68
  West Virginia Route 87
  West Virginia Route 331

Adjacent counties
 Wood County (north)
 Wirt County (northeast)
 Roane County (east)
 Kanawha County (south)
 Putnam County (southwest)
 Mason County (west)
 Meigs County, Ohio (northwest)

National protected area
 Ohio River Islands National Wildlife Refuge (part)

Demographics

2000 census
As of the census of 2000, there were 28,000 people, 11,061 households, and 8,207 families living in the county.  The population density was 60 people per square mile (23/km2).  There were 12,245 housing units at an average density of 26 per square mile (10/km2).  The racial makeup of the county was 98.75% White, 0.08% Black or African American, 0.21% Native American, 0.23% Asian, 0.01% Pacific Islander, 0.10% from other races, and 0.62% from two or more races.  0.29% of the population were Hispanic or Latino of any race.

There were 11,061 households, out of which 31.90% had children under the age of 18 living with them, 61.60% were married couples living together, 9.40% had a female householder with no husband present, and 25.80% were non-families. 22.70% of all households were made up of individuals, and 10.30% had someone living alone who was 65 years of age or older.  The average household size was 2.50 and the average family size was 2.92.

In the county, the population was spread out, with 24.10% under the age of 18, 7.90% from 18 to 24, 27.70% from 25 to 44, 24.90% from 45 to 64, and 15.30% who were 65 years of age or older.  The median age was 39 years. For every 100 females there were 94.80 males.  For every 100 females age 18 and over, there were 91.40 males.

The median income for a household in the county was $32,434, and the median income for a family was $38,021. Males had a median income of $32,991 versus $20,253 for females. The per capita income for the county was $16,205.  About 12.20% of families and 15.20% of the population were below the poverty line, including 21.60% of those under age 18 and 9.00% of those age 65 or over.

2010 census
As of the 2010 United States census, there were 29,211 people, 11,931 households, and 8,503 families living in the county. The racial makeup of the county was 98.2% white, 0.3% black or African American, 0.3% Asian, 0.2% American Indian, 0.2% from other races, and 0.9% from two or more races. Those of Hispanic or Latino origin made up 0.6% of the population. In terms of ancestry, 22.4% were American, 18.4% were German, 15.7% were Irish, and 13.7% were English.

Of the 11,931 households, 30.8% had children under the age of 18 living with them, 56.5% were married couples living together, 10.3% had a female householder with no husband present, 28.7% were non-families, and 25.0% of all households were made up of individuals. The average household size was 2.43 and the average family size was 2.88. The median age was 42.2 years.

The median income for a household in the county was $41,406 and the median income for a family was $49,395. Males had a median income of $42,862 versus $32,376 for females. The per capita income for the county was $20,633. About 14.6% of families and 18.1% of the population were below the poverty line, including 28.0% of those under age 18 and 10.5% of those age 65 or over.

Politics
Although its neighbour Roane County voted for secession on its behalf during the Virginia Secession Convention, Jackson County is believed to have had a Unionist majority when the Civil War broke out. This contention is supported by it being a historically Republican-leaning county, though much less so than the rock-ribbed Unionist trio of Ritchie, Doddridge and Tyler Counties to its northeast. The only Democrats to win the county since the Civil War have been Samuel J. Tilden in 1876, Woodrow Wilson in 1912, Franklin Delano Roosevelt in 1932, Lyndon Johnson in 1964, and Bill Clinton in 1992 and 1996.

Communities

Cities
 Ravenswood
 Ripley (county seat)

Magisterial districts

Current
 Eastern
 Northern
 Western

Historic
 Grant
 Ravenswood
 Ripley
 Union
 Washington

Unincorporated communities

 Advent
 Cottageville
 Evans
 Flatwoods
 Fletcher
 Gay
 Given
 Independence
 Kenna
 Kentuck
 LeRoy
 Millwood
 Mount Alto
 Murraysville
 Rock Castle
 Romance
 Sandyville
 Sherman

See also
 Frozen Camp Wildlife Management Area
 National Register of Historic Places listings in Jackson County, West Virginia

References

External links
 Jackson County Schools
 Jackson County Public Library
 WVGenWeb Jackson County

 
West Virginia counties on the Ohio River
Counties of Appalachia
1831 establishments in Virginia
Populated places established in 1831